Christian Rhys Doidge (born 25 August 1992) is a Welsh professional footballer who plays for Scottish Premiership club Kilmarnock, on loan from Hibernian, as a striker. Doidge played in the youth systems of Southampton and Bristol Rovers, but temporarily gave up football and played basketball for the Wales U18 national team. He resumed his football career in the Welsh leagues with Cwmbran Celtic, Croesyceiliog, Barry Town and Carmarthen Town. He then moved into English league football with Dagenham & Redbridge, and has since played for Forest Green Rovers and Bolton Wanderers.

Career

Youth career
Doidge started his career in the youth system at Southampton where he spent three years before he was released after the club thought he would not be tall enough as a centre forward. He then joined Bristol Rovers for two years, but failed to earn a youth scholarship and was released in 2008 at the age of fifteen.

He then gave up football to play basketball with his friends and played county level for Gwent ABC. Shortly after he represented Wales in the European Championship in Malta.

Welsh league football
Doidge signed with Welsh Football League Division Two side Cwmbran Celtic for the 2009–10 season, and then moved to divisional rivals Croesyceiliog in 2010. In November 2011 he joined Welsh Football League First Division side Barry Town, going on to score sixteen goals in sixteen games in his maiden season for the club. In his second season for the club he netted ten times in fourteen appearances, including a hat-trick against Goytre United which propelled Barry to the top of the table. In November 2012, he hit the winner over Penrhyncoch which helped Town to their first Welsh Cup semi-final appearance in a decade.

In January 2013, he signed for Welsh Premier League side Carmarthen Town. In just his second game for the club he came on as a substitute to help Carmarthen win the Welsh League Cup, the side's first trophy in five years. During his time with Carmarthen, he scored nineteen goals in forty-three appearances. In April 2014, he joined Football League Two side Newport County on a week trial, however no move materialised.

Dagenham & Redbridge
In July 2014, he joined League Two side Dagenham & Redbridge on trial, scoring in pre-season friendlies against Tottenham Hotspur and Billericay Town. Dagenham then pulled out of a deal to sign Doidge after discovering they would have to pay a fee to Carmarthen, having believed the striker would be available on a free transfer. A deal was eventually agreed in August for a £20,000 fee, with Doidge signing a two-year contract, having also turned down an offer to sign for Conference Premier side and former club Bristol Rovers. Shortly after signing for the Daggers, he suffered an ankle injury during the warm-up against Hartlepool United, which kept him out of action for a month. In September 2014, he made his professional debut in a 1–1 draw with Cheltenham Town, replacing Jamie Cureton as a late substitute. His first professional goal came in a 3–1 defeat to Luton Town, scoring a consolation after coming on as a substitute. He struggled to retain a place in the first team and in January 2015 he was sent on loan to Conference Premier side Dartford on a one-month loan, to regain his fitness. He made his debut in the 6–1 away defeat to Dover Athletic. In his second season at Dagenham & Redbridge he managed to play a lot more games and ended the season as top scorer. He also won the club's player of the year and their supporters' player of the year awards.

Forest Green Rovers
In June 2016, Doidge signed a two-year contract with National League side Forest Green Rovers. His first goal for Forest Green came in a 4–1 away win over Maidstone United on 27 August 2016.

On 14 May 2017, he scored in a 3–1 win over Tranmere Rovers at Wembley Stadium in the 2016–17 National League play-off final to help Forest Green claim a place in the Football League for the first time in their history.

Bolton Wanderers (loan)
On 31 August 2018, Doidge signed for Championship side Bolton Wanderers on loan, with the deal due to be made permanent in January 2019. He made his debut for Bolton in a 2–1 home defeat against Queens Park Rangers on 15 September 2018. Doidge scored his first goal for Bolton in a 1–1 draw against Rotherham United in October 2018.

On 6 January 2019, Forest Green Rovers chairman Dale Vince announced that Doidge's permanent transfer to Bolton would not be proceeding as planned, and that he would be returning to Forest Green. This was due to Bolton being under transfer embargo. Vince later accused Bolton of "contractual breaches" and claimed that Rovers had been paying the player's wages during the loan spell, commenting that he believed Bolton had "entered into a contract to loan and then buy Christian last August without the means to honour it, and perhaps the intention to do so as well." In May 2019, following Bolton's administration, he said he was "glad" that the transfer had fallen through. On 17 December 2019, Bolton and Forest Green came to an agreement over the transfer.

Hibernian
On 25 June 2019, Doidge signed for Scottish Premiership club Hibernian on a three-year contract. On 9 November 2019, he scored a hat-trick in a 4–1 win away to St Johnstone, his first league goals for the club and his first professional hat-trick. Doidge scored his second hat-trick for Hibs in a 4–2 victory against Dundee United, in the Scottish Cup 4th round, on 28 January, taking his tally for the season to 14.

Doidge missed much of pre-season during July 2021 due to suffering from the effects of COVID-19. He scored two goals in five games during the early part of the 2021–22 season, but then suffered an achilles tendon injury in August. While recovering from that injury he signed a new contract with Hibs, that is due to keep him at the club to the end of the 2023–24 season.

Doidge scored a hat-trick in the first match of the 2022–23 season, a 5–0 win against Clyde in the League Cup.

Kilmarnock (loan)
On 31 August 2022, Doidge joined Kilmarnock on loan for the 2022–23 season.

Other activities 
Whilst playing semi-professional football for Carmarthen Town he worked for South Wales Police.

Doidge has also represented the Wales U18 national basketball team and played in the 2009 U18 European Championship.

Career statistics

Honours
Carmarthen Town
 Welsh League Cup: 2012–13, 2013–14

Individual
 Welsh Premier League Team of the Year: 2013–14
 Scottish Premiership player of the month: November 2019
 EFL League Two Player of the Month: November 2017

Notes

References

External links

1992 births
Living people
Welsh footballers
Footballers from Newport, Wales
Barry Town United F.C. players
Carmarthen Town A.F.C. players
Dagenham & Redbridge F.C. players
Dartford F.C. players
Forest Green Rovers F.C. players
Bolton Wanderers F.C. players
Hibernian F.C. players
Kilmarnock F.C. players
English Football League players
National League (English football) players
Association football forwards
Scottish Professional Football League players
Cwmbrân Celtic F.C. players
Croesyceiliog A.F.C. players